Walter William Curtis (May 3, 1913 – October 18, 1997) was an American prelate of the Roman Catholic Church. He served as bishop of the Diocese of Bridgeport in Connecticut from 1961 to 1988.  Curtis previously served as an auxiliary bishop of the Archdiocese of Newark in New Jersey from 1957 to 1961.

Biography

Early life 
Walter Curtis was born on May 3, 1913, in Jersey City, New Jersey.  He studied at Fordham University in New York City. After graduating from Seton Hall University in 1934, he attended Immaculate Conception Seminary, both in South Orange, New Jersey.  Curtis then went to Rome to attend the Pontifical North American College.

Priesthood 
Curtis was ordained to the priesthood for the Archdiocese of Newark by Bishop Ralph Leo Hayes on December 8, 1937. He completed his graduate studies in Rome at the Pontifical Gregorian University in 1938.

Curtis became a professor of moral theology at Immaculate Conception Seminary in 1938. He later earned a doctorate in sacred theology from the Catholic University of America.

Auxiliary Bishop of Newark 
On June 27, 1957, Curtis was appointed as an auxiliary bishop of the Archdiocese of Newark and titular bishop of Bisica by Pope Pius XII. He received his episcopal consecration on September 24, 1957, from Archbishop Thomas Boland, with Bishops James A. McNulty and George W. Ahr serving as co-consecrators. In addition to his episcopal duties, Curtis was named pastor of Sacred Heart Parish in Bloomfield, New Jersey, in 1958.

Bishop of Bridgeport 
Curtis was named the second bishop of Bridgeport by Pope John XXIII on September 23, 1961. He was installed at St. Augustine Cathedral in Bridgeport on November 21, 1961. As bishop, Curtis established the following schools in Connecticut:

 Notre Dame Girls' High School in Fairfield
 Kolbe Cathedral High School in Bridgeport
 Notre Dame Boys' High School in Fairfield
 St. Joseph High School in Trumbull
 Immaculate High School in Danbury 
 Sacred Heart University at Fairfield in 1963

Curtis attended all four sessions of the Second Vatican Council in Rome between 1962 and 1965, and spent most of his administration implementing the Council's reforms. During the 1970s, he oversaw the renovation of St. Augustine Cathedral and its re-dedication in 1979. He established two nursing homes: Pope John Paul II Health Care Center in Danbury, Connecticut, and St. Camillus Health Care Center in Stamford, Connecticut. The Catholic population in the diocese increased from 286,000 to 300,000. He also founded the Fairfield Foundation, a nondenominational group that helps people in need in Fairfield County, Connecticut.

Retirement and legacy 
Curtis' resignation as Bishop of Bridgeport was accepted by Pope Paul II on June 28, 1988. Walter Curtis died from pneumonia at St. Joseph Manor in Trumbull, Connecticut, on October 18, 1997, at age 84.

In October 2019, former Connecticut Superior Court Judge Robert Holzberg released the results of his investigation, commissioned by Bridgeport Bishop Frank Caggiano, into the diocese's handling of accusations of sexual abuse by its priests. Holzberg found that all three of Bridgeport's bishops, including Curtis, had consistently failed to fulfill their moral and legal responsibilities. Holzberg wrote: "Bishop Curtis was undisguisedly indifferent to clergy sexual abuse in the diocese, not understanding or acknowledging its scope, and abdicating virtually all responsibility to his subordinates for responding to it, the report stated. “Bishop Curtis did not remove abusive priests from service, and even allowed many to be reassigned to new parishes. By not removing them, he made possible continued abuse of additional victims."

References

External links 
Roman Catholic Diocese of Bridgeport

1913 births
1997 deaths
Clergy from Jersey City, New Jersey
Roman Catholic bishops of Bridgeport
Participants in the Second Vatican Council
Fordham University alumni
Seton Hall University alumni
Catholic University of America alumni
20th-century Roman Catholic bishops in the United States
People from Trumbull, Connecticut
Catholics from New Jersey
Deaths from pneumonia in Connecticut